Jan Henrik Eekhout (born 10 January 1900 in Sluis - died 6 March 1978 in Amsterdam) was a Dutch writer, poet and translator, particularly known as the author of the novel Pastoor Poncke ("Pastor Poncke"). During the Second World War Eekhout was a staunch Nazi. However, the Dutch resistance fighter Jan "Poncke" Princen gained his nickname by reading aloud from this book to fellow-prisoners in a Nazi prison during World War II.

References

External links 
 Profile and some works (DBNL)

1900 births
1978 deaths
Dutch collaborators with Nazi Germany
Dutch male poets
Dutch translators
People from Sluis
20th-century translators
20th-century Dutch poets
20th-century Dutch male writers